Ibrahim Orit (born 28 July 1998) is a Ugandan footballer who plays as a winger for Vipers SC and the Uganda national football team.

Early life
Orit was born in Soroti Hospital, Soroti, Uganda, as the second born in a family of six, though both his parents died in Orit's early childhood. He attended Aloet Primary School, but had to drop out of education following the passing of his parents as there was no money to pay his school fees.

Club career
Orit started his career at Odudwi FC in Uganda's fourth tier in 2013, and had spells at Soroti Garage, Junior Eagles and Future Stars before signing for Uganda Premier League side Mbarara City in summer 2017. On 2 July 2020, it was announced that Orit had joined Ugandan champions Vipers SC on a three-year contract, becoming their second signing of that summer.

International career
Orit made his debut for Uganda on 22 January 2021 in a 2–1 defeat to Togo in the 2020 African Nations Championship. He scored his first goal for Uganda in their following match with a shot from 16 yards in a 5–2 defeat against Morocco on 26 January.

International goals
Scores and results list Uganda's goal tally first.

Style of play
Orit plays as a winger. Upon signing for the club, Vipers SC manager Fred Kajoba stated that he played as a "wide forward often cutting in from the left but has at times played on the right and off the main striker".

References

External links
 
 

1998 births
Living people
Ugandan footballers
People from Soroti District
Association football wingers
Mbarara City FC players
Vipers SC players
Uganda Premier League players
Uganda international footballers
Uganda A' international footballers
2020 African Nations Championship players
2022 African Nations Championship players